= LineDrive Baseball =

- Promotional flyer for the release of LineDrive Baseball
- Developer(s): Futureline Communications
- Publisher(s): Futureline Communications
- Platform(s): arcade

LineDrive Baseball is a video game developed and published by Futureline Communications for the arcade.

== Gameplay ==
LineDrive Baseball allows the player to play as some of the great baseball players of the past.

== Reception ==
Next Generation reviewed the arcade version of the game, rating it one star out of five, and stated that "This is the perfect example of how not to make a videogame, and it only receives one star out of kindness and because we couldn't give it any lower."
